The Culloden-class ships of the line were a class of eight 74-gun third rates, designed for the Royal Navy by Sir Thomas Slade. The Cullodens were the last class of 74s which Slade designed before his death in 1771.

Ships

Builder: Deptford Dockyard
Ordered: 30 November 1769
Launched: 18 May 1776
Fate: Wrecked, 1781

Builder: Wells, Rotherhithe
Ordered: 23 August 1781
Launched: 13 November 1783
Fate: Broken up, 1814

Builder: Perry, Wells & Green, Blackwall Yard
Ordered: 9 August 1781
Launched: 19 April 1784
Fate: Wrecked, 1804

Builder: Wells, Rotherhithe
Ordered: 13 December 1781
Launched: 28 March 1785
Fate: Broken up, 1836

Builder: Perry, Blackwall Yard
Ordered: 28 December 1781
Launched: 27 April 1785
Fate: Broken up, 1803

Builder: Randall, Rotherhithe
Ordered: 19 June 1782
Launched: 12 July 1785
Fate: Broken up, 1850

Builder: Perry, Blackwall Yard
Ordered: 19 June 1782
Launched: 15 April 1786
Fate: Captured, 1801

Builder: Perry, Blackwall Yard
Ordered: 11 July 1780
Launched: 25 September 1786
Fate: Broken up, 1814

References

Lavery, Brian (2003) The Ship of the Line - Volume 1: The development of the battlefleet 1650–1850. Conway Maritime Press. .
 Lyon, David, The Sailing Navy List, All the Ships of the Royal Navy - Built, Purchased and Captured 1688-1860, pub Conway Maritime Press, 1993, 

 
Ship of the line classes